is a retired professional Japanese baseball player. He played catcher for the Yokohama BayStars, Saitama Seibu Lions and Chunichi Dragons.

External links

 NPB.com

1984 births
Living people
Baseball people from Aichi Prefecture
Japanese baseball players
Nippon Professional Baseball catchers
Yokohama BayStars players
Saitama Seibu Lions players
Chunichi Dragons players
Japanese baseball coaches
Nippon Professional Baseball coaches